Tumor protein p53-inducible nuclear protein 1 is a protein that in humans is encoded by the TP53INP1 gene. In mice this protein is also called TRP53INP1 and is encoded by the Trp53inp1 gene. The protein is also referred to as SIP or "stress inducible protein"

Interactions
TP53INP1 has been shown to interact with HIPK2 and p53.

References

Further reading